The United States women's national artistic gymnastics team represents the United States in FIG international competitions. Currently, the U.S. team is the reigning World team champion and the reigning Olympic team silver medalists, with the four gymnasts nicknamed the "Fighting Four".

History 
The U.S. women won the team competition bronze medal at the 1948 Summer Olympics. Afterwards, they did not win another Summer Olympics or World Championships medal until the 1984 when the Olympic team won silver. During that competition, Mary Lou Retton also became the first American to win the individual all-around gold medal. The Americans started consistently winning Olympic and World team medals in the early 1990s with future Hall of Famers Shannon Miller and Dominique Dawes. The 1996 Olympic team, known as the Magnificent Seven, was the first American team to win Olympic gold. An iconic moment in the sport's history came late in the competition, when an injured Kerri Strug stuck a vault to secure the title. After 1996, the team regressed for several years as their stars took breaks from competing.

Márta Károlyi headed the program after the 2000 Olympics, ushering in an era of success for the US as they became one of the most dominant countries in women's gymnastics. The US has medalled in every Olympics and Worlds since 2000. They won their first World gold medal in 2003. At the 2004 Olympics, they won the team silver, and Carly Patterson became the second American gymnast to win the individual all-around. The US continued their success in the next quad. They won another Olympic silver medal in 2008. Nastia Liukin and Shawn Johnson were two of the best gymnasts of their era and finished first and second in the 2008 individual all-around.

Since their second-place finish at the 2010 Worlds, the US has never lost an Olympic or World team competition. They won gold at the 2011 Worlds and then won gold at the 2012 Olympics by over five points. The 2012 team was nicknamed the Fierce Five and included Gabby Douglas, the first woman of color to win the Olympic individual all-around. In 2013, Simone Biles started her senior career and helped the US dominate the sport through 2016. In addition to the team gold medals, Biles won the individual all-around at the Worlds and Olympics for four straight years. The 2016 Olympic team, featuring Biles and veterans Douglas and Aly Raisman, was named the Final Five. They won the team competition by over eight points.

Olympic Games 
The USA Gymnastics women have won the Olympic Gold three times, in 1996, 2012, and 2016. These successes led to the nicknames Magnificent Seven, Fierce Five, and Final Five, respectively. They won four silvers in 1984, 2004, 2008, and 2020 and three bronzes in 1948, 1992 and 2000. The 2016 team name referenced Márta Károlyi's final team to coach and that the team structure will be changed to four members beginning with the 2020 Olympic Games. The 1988 Olympic Games was the only year in which the team did not medal since its formation in 1982, though they would've won the bronze medal had they not been handed a deduction to their overall score during the competition. Six American women have won the Olympic individual all-around title, including five consecutive titles from 2004–20: Mary Lou Retton (1984), Carly Patterson (2004), Nastia Liukin (2008), Gabby Douglas (2012), Simone Biles (2016), and Sunisa Lee (2020). The most decorated American gymnast at the Olympics is a tie between Shannon Miller with 7 medals (2 gold, 2 silver, 3 bronze) and Simone Biles (4 gold, 1 silver, 2 bronze).

World Championships 
The United States women team is currently 3nd in the all-time medal count for the World Artistic Gymnastics Championships. The first American gymnast to win a medal at the World Championships was Cathy Rigby who won silver on beam in 1970. The first female American gymnast to win a world title was Marcia Frederick in 1978 on the uneven bars. The most decorated American gymnast at the World Championships is Simone Biles, who won 25 medals (19 gold, 3 silver and 3 bronze) from 2013 to 2019. The United States won team gold in 2003, 2007, 2011, 2014, 2015, 2018, and 2019. Additionally, eight American women have won the individual World all-around title: Kim Zmeskal (1991), Shannon Miller (1993-1994), Chellsie Memmel (2005), Shawn Johnson (2007), Bridget Sloan (2009), Jordyn Wieber (2011), Simone Biles (2013-2015, 2018-2019), and Morgan Hurd (2017). Biles is the only American gymnast to win both the Olympic and World all-around titles.

Current roster

Senior team
:

Junior team
:

Staff 
 Dan Baker – Developmental Lead
 Chellsie Memmel – Technical Lead
 Alicia Sacramone-Quinn – Strategic Lead
 Annie Heffernon – Senior Vice President
 Krissy Klein – Women's Program Manager
 Kim Riley – Managing Director of Athlete and Coaching Programs

Team competition results

Olympic Games
 1928 — did not participate
 1936 — 5th place
Jennie Caputo, Consetta Caruccio-Lenz, Margaret Duff, Irma Haubold, Marie Kibler, Ada Lunardonl, Adelaide Meyer, Mary Wright
 1948 —  bronze medal
Ladislava Bakanic, Marian Barone, Consetta Caruccio-Lenz, Dorothy Dalton, Meta Elste-Neumann, Helen Schifano, Clara Schroth, Anita Simonis
 1952 — 15th place
Marian Barone, Dorothy Dalton, Meta Elste-Neumann, Ruth Grulkowski, Marie Hoesly, Doris Kirkman, Clara Schroth, Ruth Topalian
 1956 — 9th place
Muriel Davis, Doris Fuchs, Judy Howe, Jackie Klein, Joyce Racek, Sandra Ruddick
 1960 — 9th place
Muriel Davis, Doris Fuchs, Betty-Jean Maycock, Teresa Montefusco, Sharon Richardson, Gail Sontegrath
 1964 — 9th place
Kathleen Corrigan, Muriel Davis, Dale McClements, Linda Metheny, Janie Speaks, Marie Walther
 1968 — 6th place
Wendy Cluff, Kathy Gleason, Linda Metheny, Colleen Mulvihill, Cathy Rigby, Joyce Tanac
 1972 — 4th place
Kimberly Chace, Linda Metheny, Joan Moore, Roxanne Pierce, Cathy Rigby, Nancy Thies
 1976 — 6th place
Colleen Casey, Kimberly Chace, Carrie Englert, Doris Howard, Debra Wilcox, Leslie Wolfsberger
 1980 — did not participate
 1984 —  silver medal
Pam Bileck, Michelle Dusserre, Kathy Johnson, Julianne McNamara, Mary Lou Retton, Tracee Talavera
 1988 — 4th place
Brandy Johnson, Kelly Garrison, Melissa Marlowe, Phoebe Mills, Hope Spivey, Chelle Stack
 1992 —  bronze medal
Wendy Bruce, Dominique Dawes, Shannon Miller, Betty Okino, Kerri Strug, Kim Zmeskal
 1996 —  gold medal
Amanda Borden, Amy Chow, Dominique Dawes, Shannon Miller, Dominique Moceanu, Jaycie Phelps, Kerri Strug
 2000 —  bronze medal
Amy Chow, Jamie Dantzscher, Dominique Dawes, Kristen Maloney, Elise Ray, Tasha Schwikert
 2004 —  silver medal
Mohini Bhardwaj, Annia Hatch, Terin Humphrey, Courtney Kupets, Courtney McCool, Carly Patterson
 2008 —  silver medal
Shawn Johnson, Nastia Liukin, Chellsie Memmel, Samantha Peszek, Alicia Sacramone, Bridget Sloan
 2012 —  gold medal
Gabby Douglas, McKayla Maroney, Aly Raisman, Kyla Ross, Jordyn Wieber
 2016 —  gold medal
Simone Biles, Gabby Douglas, Laurie Hernandez, Madison Kocian, Aly Raisman
 2020 —  silver medal
Simone Biles, Jordan Chiles, Sunisa Lee, Grace McCallum

World Championships

Names in italics are alternates who received a team medal.
 1934 — did not participate
 1938 — did not participate
 1950 — did not participate
 1954 — did not participate
 1958 — did not participate
 1962 — 8th place
Muriel Davis, Doris Fuchs, Betty-Jean Maycock, Gail Sontegrath, Avis Tieber, Marie Walther
 1966 — 6th place
Debbie Bailey, Doris Fuchs, Dale McClements, Kathy Gleason, Carolyn Hacker, Joyce Tanac
 1970 — 7th place
Cleo Carver, Kimberly Chace, Wendy Cluff, Adele Gleaves, Joan Moore, Cathy Rigby
 1974 — 6th place
Janette Anderson, Ann Carr, Diane Dunbar, Debbie Fike, Kathy Howard, Joan Moore
 1978 — 5th place
Christa Canary, Marcia Frederick, Kathy Johnson, Leslie Pyfer, Rhonda Schwandt, Donna Turnbow
 1979 — 6th place
Christa Canary, Marcia Frederick, Kathy Johnson, Suzy Kellams, Leslie Pyfer, Leslie Russo
 1981 — 6th place
Michelle Goodwin, Kathy Johnson, Amy Koopman, Julianne McNamara, Gina Stallone, Tracee Talavera
 1983 — 7th place
Pam Bileck, Kelly Garrison, Kathy Johnson, Julianne McNamara, Yumi Mordre, Tanya Service
 1985 — 6th place
Pam Bileck, Tracey Calore, Kelly Garrison, Sabrina Mar, Marie Roethlisberger, Jennifer Sey
 1987 — 6th place
Rhonda Faehn, Kelly Garrison, Sabrina Mar, Melissa Marlowe, Phoebe Mills, Kristie Phillips
 1989 — 4th place
Wendy Bruce, Christy Henrich, Brandy Johnson, Kim Kelly, Chelle Stack, Sandy Woolsey
 1991 —  silver medal
Michelle Campi, Hilary Grivich, Shannon Miller, Betty Okino, Kerri Strug, Kim Zmeskal
 1994 —  silver medal
Amanda Borden, Amy Chow, Dominique Dawes, Larissa Fontaine, Shannon Miller, Jaycie Phelps, Kerri Strug
 1995 —  bronze medal
Mary Beth Arnold, Theresa Kulikowski, Shannon Miller, Dominique Moceanu, Jaycie Phelps, Kerri Strug, Doni Thompson
 1997 — 6th place
Kendall Beck, Mohini Bhardwaj, Kristen Maloney, Dominique Moceanu, Kristy Powell, Jennie Thompson
 1999 — 5th place
Jeanette Antolin, Vanessa Atler, Jamie Dantzscher, Kristen Maloney, Elise Ray, Morgan White
 2001 —  bronze medal
Mohini Bhardwaj, Katie Heenan, Ashley Miles, Tasha Schwikert, Rachel Tidd, Tabitha Yim
 2003 —  gold medal
Terin Humphrey, Courtney Kupets, Chellsie Memmel, Carly Patterson, Tasha Schwikert, Hollie Vise
 2006 —  silver medal
Jana Bieger, Natasha Kelley, Nastia Liukin, Chellsie Memmel, Ashley Priess, Alicia Sacramone
 2007 —  gold medal
Ivana Hong, Shawn Johnson, Nastia Liukin, Samantha Peszek, Alicia Sacramone, Shayla Worley
 2010 —  silver medal
Rebecca Bross, Mackenzie Caquatto, Mattie Larson, Aly Raisman, Alicia Sacramone, Bridget Sloan
 2011 —  gold medal
Gabby Douglas, McKayla Maroney, Aly Raisman, Alicia Sacramone, Sabrina Vega, Jordyn Wieber
 2014 —  gold medal
Alyssa Baumann, Simone Biles, Madison Desch, Madison Kocian, Ashton Locklear, Kyla Ross, MyKayla Skinner
 2015 —  gold medal
Simone Biles, Gabby Douglas, Brenna Dowell, Madison Kocian, Maggie Nichols, Aly Raisman, MyKayla Skinner
 2018 —  gold medal
Simone Biles, Kara Eaker, Morgan Hurd, Grace McCallum, Riley McCusker, Ragan Smith
 2019 —  gold medal
Simone Biles, Jade Carey, Kara Eaker, Sunisa Lee, Grace McCallum, MyKayla Skinner
 2022 —  gold medal
Skye Blakely, Jade Carey, Jordan Chiles, Shilese Jones, Leanne Wong, Lexi Zeiss

Junior World Championships
Names in italics are alternates who received a team medal.
 2019 —  bronze medal
Sydney Barros, Skye Blakely, Kayla DiCello, Konnor McClain

Most decorated gymnasts
This list includes all American female artistic gymnasts who have won at least four medals at the Olympic Games and the World Artistic Gymnastics Championships combined.

Best international results

Hall of Famers 
Nine national team gymnasts, one national team coach, and one official have been inducted into the International Gymnastics Hall of Fame:
 Béla Károlyi (coach) – 1997
 Mary Lou Retton – 1997
 Cathy Rigby – 1997
 Shannon Miller – 2006
 Dominique Dawes – 2009
 Kim Zmeskal – 2012
 Jackie Fie (FIG official) – 2014
 Alicia Sacramone – 2017
 Nastia Liukin – 2018
 Shawn Johnson – 2019
 Chellsie Memmel – 2022

See also
 Artistic gymnastics in the United States
 United States men's national artistic gymnastics team
 List of former United States women's national gymnastics team rosters
 List of U.S. National Championships medalists in gymnastics
 List of Olympic female artistic gymnasts for the United States
 United States at the World Artistic Gymnastics Championships

References 

National women's artistic gymnastics teams
Gymnastics
Gymnastics in the United States
Women's gymnastics teams in the United States